Alagakkonara, also known as Alakeshwara, were a prominent feudal family that provided powerful ministers and military rulers during the medieval period in Sri Lanka. Some historians claim that the family was of Tamil origin, possibly from Madurai or Kanchipuram in Tamil Nadu, India. The family arrived in Sri Lanka around the 13th century and naturalized themselves in Sri Lanka. 

One member of the family is noted for founding the current capital of Sri Lanka, Sri Jayawardenepura Kotte as a fort from which he waged a war against encroaching tax collectors from the Jaffna kingdom in the north. The family lost most of its influence after its leader was taken captive by the Ming Dynasty (Chinese) Admiral Zheng He in 1411.

Origin of the family
The first member of the family to arrive in Sri Lanka was named Nissanka Alagakonara, who migrated to Sri Lanka from a place called Vanchipura or Kanchipuram. Although they initially concentrated on mercantile activities and became wealthy, they eventually accrued political power with the local Kingdom of Gampola by the 14th century. This was helped by their conversion to Buddhism following their arrival in the island.

Rise to political dominance
During the 1350s due to periodic invasions of the western region of Sri Lanka by the northern based Jaffna kingdom, many regions had begun to pay tribute and taxes to the Arya Chakaravarthi kings. The third member of the family to figure in historical accounts, known only as Nissanka Alakesvara, was a minister of the local king Vikramabahu III of Gampola fortified a marshy region around present day Colombo region, on the marshes to the south of the Kelani River. He called the fortress Jayewardhanapura, and the area became known as Kotte, "The fort". By 1369 Alakesvara drove out the tax collectors and attacked the encampments of soldiers from Jaffna kingdom who attempted to invade the Sinhalese kingdoms at Chilaw and Negombo killing a large number of them and forcing the rest to retreat. The Arya Chakaravarthi launched a second invasion attempt during the reign of Bhuvanaikabahu V of Gampola, landing in the southern kingdom by land and sea. Although the king initially fled his capital, his army defeated the force that approached along the ground in Matale. alakeshwara simultaneously attacked the troops that arrived by sea, routing them at Dematagoda, and destroying their ships at Panadura.

Although most Sinhalese sources mention that he was able to defeat the invaders, there is a conflicting epigraph by the Kings of Jaffna known as the Kotagama inscription detailing how the King of Jaffna had prevailed.

Subsequently, local sources are clear that he began to be viewed as a credible leader and overshadowed the actual king and came to be considered as the real power.

End of the family's power

After Alakeswara’s death, established as between 1382 and 1392, there was disunity in his family with family members fighting each other for power and procession. Kumara Alakesvara, half-brother of king Bhuvanaikabahu V of Gampola controlled the region from 1386–87 and was followed by Vira Alakesvara of Gampola from 1387 onwards until 1391, when he was ousted by the rival claimants relative. He came back to power with the help of foreign mercenaries in 1399. He ruled until 1411 when he confronted the visiting Chinese Admiral Zheng He resulting in a war. Zheng captured and took him to China, returning him to the country a year later. However the humiliation suffered due to this incident, and the decades of infighting within the family, greatly diminished its political power.

Notes

References

External links
Kings of Gampola, Sri Lanka
The new Parliament

House of Siri Sanga Bo
Monarchs of Gampola
Sinhalese kings
14th-century Sinhalese monarchs
15th-century Sinhalese monarchs